The women's high jump at the 1954 European Athletics Championships was held in Bern, Switzerland, at Stadion Neufeld on 25 and 28 August 1954.

Medalists

Results

Final
28 August

Qualification
25 August

Participation
According to an unofficial count, 14 athletes from 9 countries participated in the event.

 (2)
 (1)
 (2)
 (1)
 (1)
 (2)
 (1)
 (2)
 (2)

References

High jump
High jump at the European Athletics Championships
Euro